Parliamentary elections were held in Italian Trust Territory of Somaliland in February 1956. The result was a victory for the Somali Youth League (SYL), which won 43 of the 60 elected seats in the Territorial Council.

Electoral system
The Territorial Council had a total of 70 seats, of which 60 were elected in 25 constituencies ranging in size from one to five seats. The other ten seats were reserved for minority groups; four for Italians, four for Arabs, one for Indians and one for Pakistanis. Only men over the age of 21 were allowed to vote, whilst candidates had to be at least 30, literate in both Arabic and Roman alphabets, and have been resident in Somalia for at least a year prior to the elections.

The elections were direct in towns and municipalities, but indirect in rural areas, where members were elected by 613 "shirs" (open councils) between November 1955 and January 1956.

Results

References

1956 in Somalia
Italian Somaliland
Elections in Somalia
February 1956 events in Africa
Election and referendum articles with incomplete results